Nesbyen Idrettslag is a multi-sports club from Nes, Buskerud, Norway.

Established in 1902, it has sections for alpine skiing, cross-country skiing, association football, handball, athletics, and orienteering.

The athletics section arranged the Norwegian Championships in 1987. Pål Gunnar Mikkelsplass competed in athletics for the club.

The club currently has no junior or senior teams in football.

References

External links
Official site 

Sports teams in Norway
Athletics clubs in Norway
Sports clubs established in 1902
Sport in Buskerud
1902 establishments in Norway